Jimmy Blakeney was the 2003  US National Freestyle Champion and is a five-time member of the U.S. Men's Freestyle Kayak Team.

References

Kayakers
Living people
Year of birth missing (living people)